Ambrose is an English surname. Notable people with the surname include:
Alice Ambrose (1906–2001), American philosopher, logician, and author
Ashley Ambrose (born 1970), former American football player
Autpert Ambrose (c. 730–784), Frankish Benedictine monk who became abbot of San Vicenzo, Italy
Charles Ambrose (1791–1856), English organist, composer, choir director, and music educator
Curtly Ambrose (born 1963), West Indian cricketer
Darren Ambrose (born 1984), English footballer
David Ambrose, British novelist and screenwriter
Dean Ambrose (born 1985), ring name of American professional wrestler Jonathan Good
Dick Ambrose (born 1953), former American football linebacker
Donetta Ambrose (born 1945), United States federal judge
Eddie Ambrose (1894–1994), American jockey
Efe Ambrose (born 1988), Nigerian footballer
Erin Ambrose (born 1994), Canadian ice hockey player
Gladys Ambrose (1930–1998), English film and television actress
Isaac Ambrose (1604–1663/64), English Puritan divine
James R. Ambrose (born 1922), former aerospace executive and U.S. Under Secretary of the Army
John Ambrose (Royal Navy officer) (c. 1705–1771), Royal Navy officer
John Thomas Ambrose, former Deputy U.S. Marshal, convicted in 2009 of leaking information about a federal witness
John Wolfe Ambrose (1838–1899), Irish-American engineer and developer
J. J. Ambrose (born 1981), American mixed martial artist
Lauren Ambrose (born 1978), American actress
Marcos Ambrose (born 1976), Australian race car driver
Myles Ambrose, former U.S. Commissioner of Customs
Paddy Ambrose (1928–2002), Irish footballer and coach
Patrick Ambrose (born 1991), Australian rules football player
Paul Ambrose (1868–1941), Canadian organist, conductor, composer, and music educator
Richard Ambrose (born 1972), former Australian rules footballer
Rob Ambrose (born 1970), American footballer and coach
Robert Ambrose (1824–1908), Canadian composer
Rona Ambrose (born 1969), Canadian politician
Rosalind Ambrose (born 1953), Vincentian radiologist
Sharon Ambrose (1939–2017), U.S. politician
Simon Ambrose, 2007 winner of the BBC reality TV show The Apprentice, chairman of the London Contemporary Orchestra
Simon Ambrose, a character from the Johnny English movies
Stephen Ambrose (1936–2002), American historian
Stuart Ambrose (born 1943), former English cricketer
Tim Ambrose (born 1982), English cricketer
Tommy Ambrose, Canadian singer-songwriter
Tony Ambrose (1933–2008), British rally driver
Walt Ambrose (1905–unknown), American footballer
Warren Ambrose (1914–1995), American mathematician
William Ambrose (1813–1873), bardic name Emrys, 19th-century Welsh language poet
William Ambrose (politician) (1832–1908), English judge and politician
J. Willis Ambrose (1911–1974), first President of the Geological Association of Canada

Fictional characters
Desmond Ambrose, a character on Desmond's

English-language surnames